Parliament Square is a square in the City of Westminster, London. 

It may also refer to:

Parliament Square, Berne, Switzerland
Parliament Square, Dublin, Ireland; part of Trinity College, Dublin
Parliament Square, Edinburgh, Scotland
Parliament Square, Hobart, Australia
Parliament Square, Melbourne, Australia
Parliament Square, Nassau, The Bahamas
Parliament Square, Ramsey, Isle of Man
Parliament Square, Toronto, Canada

See also
Parliament House (disambiguation)
National Assembly Square (disambiguation)